The 1973–74 Cypriot Cup was the 32nd edition of the Cypriot Cup. A total of 40 clubs entered the competition. It began on 6 March 1974 with the preliminary round and concluded on 23 June 1974 with the final which was held at GSP Stadium. AC Omonia won their 3rd Cypriot Cup trophy after beating Enosis Neon Paralimni 2–0 in the final.

Format 
In the 1973–74 Cypriot Cup, participated all the teams of the Cypriot First Division, the Cypriot Second Division and the Cypriot Third Division.

The competition consisted of six knock-out rounds. In all rounds each tie was played as a single leg and was held at the home ground of the one of the two teams, according to the draw results. Each tie winner was qualifying to the next round. If a match was drawn, extra time was following. If extra time was drawn, there was a replay at the ground of the team who were away for the first game. If the rematch was also drawn, then extra time was following and if the match remained drawn after extra time the winner was decided by penalty shoot-out.

The cup winner secured a place in the 1974–75 European Cup Winners' Cup.

Preliminary round 
In the preliminary round participated 4 teams of 1973–74 Cypriot Second Division and all 12 teams of 1973–74 Cypriot Third Division.

First round 
14 clubs from the 1973–74 Cypriot First Division and 10 clubs from the 1973–74 Cypriot Second Division were added.

Second round

Quarter-finals

Semi-finals

Final

Sources

Bibliography

See also 
 Cypriot Cup
 1973–74 Cypriot First Division

Cypriot Cup seasons
1973–74 domestic association football cups
1973–74 in Cypriot football